David Graeme Hancock  (born August 10, 1955) is a Canadian lawyer and was the 15th premier of Alberta in 2014. Since 2017, he has served as a judge of the Provincial Court of Alberta. From 1997 to 2014, he was a Member of the Legislative Assembly of Alberta representing Edmonton-Whitemud as a Progressive Conservative until announcing his resignation from the legislature on September 12, 2014.

Early life
Hancock was born August 10, 1955 in Fort Resolution, Northwest Territories, grew up in Hazelton, British Columbia, went to high school in Fort Vermilion, Alberta before moving to Edmonton in 1972. He went to the University of Alberta for his undergraduate degree in Political Science, graduated in 1975, was a member of the Phi Gamma Delta fraternity at University of Alberta and received his law degree.

Hancock was politically involved from a young age, serving as the president of the Progressive Conservative Association of Alberta's youth wing from 1974–1976 and later served as party president from 1990–1992. Under his leadership, the Progressive Conservative Party instituted a one-member-one-vote system for leadership conventions, introduced a Statement of Principles and a grassroots policy development process.

Before being elected, Hancock was a partner with Matheson and Company, Barristers and Solicitors.

Political career

Electoral record
Hancock was defeated by Mike Percy in the 1993 election. Mike Percy's retirement after serving one term in the Legislature for the Alberta Liberal Party left open the constituency of Edmonton-Whitemud, the riding once held by former Premier Don Getty. Hancock secured the PC nomination and squared off against Corky Meyer of the Liberals and Charan Khehra of the Alberta New Democratic Party in the 1997 provincial election. He won the constituency with 51 per cent of the vote, beating runner-up Meyer by 2,020 votes and was one of only two Progressive Conservatives elected in Edmonton's 19 constituencies (Julius Yankowsky, Edmonton-Beverly-Clareview,was the other.)

Hancock was returned to the Legislature in the 2001 provincial election, increasing his share of the popular vote to 59 per cent. In the 2004 provincial election, Hancock was one of only three out of 10 incumbent PC MLAs in Edmonton to retain their seat by defeating Liberal Donna Smith by 929 votes while winning 46 per cent of the vote and was elected to his fourth term in the 2008 provincial election, winning 58 per cent of the vote in beating Liberal Nancy Cavanaugh by 5,049 votes.

Klein Ministry
Hancock spent his entire provincial political career in cabinet. As a rookie MLA in the 24th Alberta Legislature, Premier Ralph Klein named him Minister of Intergovernmental and Aboriginal Affairs. In that capacity, he spearheaded the creation of the Aboriginal Policy Framework, which set out the basic structure for existing and new governmental policies regarding aboriginal affairs.

Two years into his first term, Hancock was promoted to Minister of Justice and Solicitor General and Government House Leader. During his five years as Justice Minister, he worked to limit conditional sentencing for violent crime, drunk driving offenders, developed a flagging system to identify Alberta's chronic drunk drivers and introduced specialized domestic violence courts.

Hancock remained Justice and Solicitor General Minister and House Leader after his re-election in 2001, but was also given the job of Attorney General. He served in those roles until after the 2004 election, when Klein appointed him Minister of Advanced Education. During his time in that job, Hancock was most noted for passing the Access to the Future Act, which created a $1 billion endowment fund for post-secondary education; known valued at $3 billion and approved degree-granting status for several small colleges in the province.

2006 Leadership bid

In April 2006, Hancock resigned from his post as Minister of Advanced Education and announced his intentions to replace Klein as the leader of the Progressive Conservative Party. He was considered a long shot against favourites like former provincial treasurer Jim Dinning and Ted Morton. His leadership campaign was managed by Brian Mulawka. It was headquartered in Edmonton where he had been an MLA and where most of his support. Hancock was unable to secure any endorsements from PC caucus members, but was endorsed by Edmonton-Centre Conservative MP Laurie Hawn and placed fifth on the first ballot, garnering 7,595 votes, more than 20,000 votes behind first place Dinning. Having achieved only 2% of the votes cast, Hancock gained the nickname “Mr 2%”. Hancock, along with five others, were dropped from the second ballot and with fellow leadership candidates Mark Norris and Lyle Oberg, supported Stelmach on the final ballot.

Stelmach and Redford ministries 
When Ed Stelmach won the leadership and subsequently became Premier in December 2006, he promoted Hancock to the health portfolio. As health minister, he presided over funding increases for the Alberta Bone and Joint Health Institute, enhanced access to cardiac, cancer care through process improvements, an increase of primary care networks to 8 across the province, initiated several health prevention measures: including a wellness fund for healthy communities, expansion of metabolic screening, and a new colorectal cancer screening program.

Stelmach appointed Hancock Minister of Education following the provincial election in March 2008.  He has approved funding increases to accredited private schools, and announced plans to build 18 new schools in Edmonton and Calgary.

On December 6, 2013, Hancock was appointed as Deputy Premier, Minister of Innovation and Advanced Education and was the Minister of Human Services and Government House Leader under the Redford government.

Premier of Alberta
Following the announcement of Alison Redford's resignation as both leader of the Progressive Conservative Party and premier, he was named interim party leader by the Progressive Conservative caucus on March 20, 2014, and, with such confidence from the majority of the legislature, was appointed as Premier of Alberta. Hancock was sworn in at Government House on March 23, 2014.

Hancock was succeeded as Premier and PC party leader by Jim Prentice on September 15, 2014. Hancock also retired from the legislature on the same day. He is the shortest serving premier in the province's history.

Hancock's official portrait as Premier was unveiled on February 13, 2017. Hancock joked at the ceremony saying that his premiership was "the best summer job that I’ve ever had", and that he expected his portrait to be "one the size of a postage stamp" based on the short length of his administration. Other politicians in attendance paid tribute to Hancock's long hours in the legislature to pass legislation, and his lengthy tenure in government holding eight cabinet portfolios.

Personal life
Hancock lives in Edmonton with his wife Janet, who is a principal at Lillian Osborne High School in Edmonton. He has three children.

Electoral record

References

External links
 David Hancock Website

1955 births
Living people
Progressive Conservative Association of Alberta MLAs
Members of the Executive Council of Alberta
Lawyers in Alberta
University of Alberta alumni
People from the Northwest Territories
Politicians from Edmonton
Premiers of Alberta
Canadian King's Counsel
University of Alberta Faculty of Law alumni
21st-century Canadian politicians